Berwick High School, abbreviated BHS, is a high school in Berwick, Louisiana, United States. It is a part of the St. Mary Parish School Board.

During the academic years of 2007, 2008, and 2013, U.S. News & World Report recognized Berwick High School as a bronze medal school, ranking it as one of the best high schools in the United States in an annual report.

Extracurricular activities
Berwick High offers 4-H Club, Anime Club, Beta Club, Chess Club, Drama Club, Guitar Club, FBLA, FFA, Foreign Language Club, Governor's Program on Abstinence, Insight, Interact, Key Club, Math & Science Club, Mu Alpha Theta, Ping Pong Club, Quiz Bowl, SADD, Social Studies Club, Student Council, HOSA, and Yearbook.

Athletics
Berwick is in District 9-3A of the LHSAA and offers athletic programs, such as football, cheerleading, cross country, swim team, volleyball, basketball, baseball, softball, dancing, track and field, bowling, power-lifting and golf. 

The current Athletic Director is Coach Craig Brodie.

Championships
Baseball Championships
The baseball team won the Class 2A State Championship in 1978 defeating John Curtis High School by a score of 2-0. In 2018, they won the Class 3A State Championship, defeating Iota High School 7-2. 

Softball Championships
The softball team is a two-time state championship team under the direction of Lloyd Burchfield.

Tennis Championships
The tennis team won state in 2012 and were state runner-up in 2013.

Band
Berwick High School's band, the Sound of Pride, has won sweepstakes honors at Louisiana's State Instrumental Festival for 2005, 2006, 2007, 2009, 2010, 2011, 2012, and 2014. The band also competes in Class A at the Louisiana Showcase of Marching Bands.  The Sound of Pride has won three back-to-back championships from 2001 to 2003 and back-to-back championships from 2006 to 2008. Since 2013, the Sound of Pride has been under the direction of Mrs. BJ McCarter.

References

External links
 
 St. Mary Parish School board Website

Public high schools in Louisiana
Schools in St. Mary Parish, Louisiana